The Ronde van Oost-Vlaanderen was a Belgian cycling race organized for the last time in 1973. 

The course, in the province of East Flanders, was around 200 km. Evergem was both start and finish place.

The competition's roll of honor includes the successes of Benoni Beheyt and Eddy Merckx.

Winners

References 

Cycle races in Belgium
1960 establishments in Belgium
Defunct cycling races in Belgium
Recurring sporting events established in 1960
Recurring sporting events disestablished in 1973
1973 disestablishments in Belgium